Lohi Bher Wildlife Park is a zoo located in Lohi Bher in Islamabad. Established in 1992, the area encompasses 687 acres. The park provides canteens and cafeterias for the tourists and visitors.

See also 
 List of zoos in Pakistan
 List of parks and gardens in Pakistan

References

External links 
 Wildlife Parks in Pakistan

Zoos in Pakistan
Parks in Pakistan
Articles needing infobox zoo
Wildlife parks in Pakistan